The Battle of Estero Rojas took place on 24 September 1867, when a Brazilian convoy, coming from Tuyutí to Tuju-Cuê, was attacked by Paraguayan troops under the command of Vallois Rivarola.

To a lesser extent, the Brazilian forces, under the command of general Albino de Carvalho, were saved by the arrival of general Manuel Marques de Sousa forces, who repelled the Paraguayans.

References 

Battles involving Paraguay
Battles of the Paraguayan War
Battles involving Brazil
September 1867 events
Conflicts in 1867